Gaston Christian School is a private Christian school located in Lowell, North Carolina.

History
"GCS" was founded in 1979 by a group of parents who wished to have a college preparatory, Christian school. With support of the pastors of Parkwood Baptist Church and First ARP Church, it was opened in 1980 in Parkwood Baptist Church educational facilities. It opened a second campus, provided by Catawba Heights Baptist Church, in 1991. In 1994, it entered into a contract with the Sisters of Mercy to lease a portion of the old Sacred Heart College campus in Belmont for use by the middle and High school.

Today
Gaston Christian is the largest private school in Gaston County, North Carolina, with nearly 900 students in the school, ranging from PK3 to 12th grade located on a single campus.  The  campus features a gymnasium, pre-school and elementary building, middle/high school building and sports facilities for softball, baseball, soccer and cross country.

Mascot
The mascot for Gaston Christian is the mighty eagle. It is inspired by Isaiah 40:31 (But those who hope in the LORD will renew their strength. They will soar on wings like eagles; they will run and not grow weary, they will walk and not be faint.)

Sports
In 2014, Gaston Christian had 24 athletic teams in 14 sports, including boys and girls basketball, boys and girls soccer, boys and girls tennis, cross country, swimming, softball, baseball, golf, and cheerleading. In 2007, the boys soccer team reached the state tournament and finished ranked 12th in the state. One of the students was placed on the All-State team. In 2007/2008, the girls' basketball team reached the state tournament and finished ranked 10th in the state. In 2008, the boys' baseball team reached the state tournament and finished ranked 12th in the state. The girls' softball team reached the state tournament in 2008, where they lost in the finals to conference rivals Northside Christian Academy, finishing the season ranked 2nd in the state.  However, in 2010, the Lady Eagles softball team surged to take home the State Championship trophy, having defeated several well-prepared teams in challenging tournament play.

References

External links
 Gaston Christian School

Christian schools in North Carolina
Private elementary schools in North Carolina
Private middle schools in North Carolina
Private high schools in North Carolina
Schools in Gaston County, North Carolina
Preparatory schools in North Carolina